The advertising industry is the global industry of public relation and marketing companies, media services and advertising agencies - largely controlled today by just a few international holding companies (WPP plc, Omnicom, Publicis Groupe, Interpublic and Dentsu). It is a global, multibillion-dollar business that connects manufacturers and consumers. The industry ranges from nonprofit organizations to Fortune 500 companies.

Revenues of U.S. advertising agencies (more than 65,000 advertising businesses employing more than 248,000 employees) were $166.8 billion in 2014. In 2016, global advertising sales reached $493 billion. For 2017 it was estimated that digital ad sales were first to surpass the TV market.

Trade associations
A non-comprehensive list of national and supranational advocacy organisations of the industry includes:
International Advertising Association (IAA) (international)
Advertising Association (UK)
Association of National Advertisers (US)
American Advertising Federation (US)
Advertising Standards Authority (disambiguation) (various)
Philippine Association of National Advertisers (Philippines)

Programs
AdChoices
Adwords
Google Guaranteed
Google Local Ads
Bing Ads
Yahoo Ads
Facebook Ads
Instagram Ads
Linkedin Ads
Shavesh Marketing .

References

 
Industries (economics)